By the Throat is the second studio album by experimental and drone musician Ben Frost.

Reception

Electronic musician Tim Hecker named By the Throat as his favorite album of 2009. Resident Advisor—an online magazine with a focus on electronic music—named By the Throat as the 16th best album of 2009.

Track listing

References

2009 albums
Ben Frost albums